Benjamin Brown (May 12, 1945 – May 12, 1967) was an African-American student at Jackson State University active in the civil rights movement, killed on campus during a standoff between law enforcement and students. Upon encountering the standoff (at the sidelines) after picking up a sandwich from a cafe to bring back to his wife, he was shot by two stray shotgun blasts from law enforcement firing into the crowd. No arrests were ever made.

In 2001, a Hinds County grand jury reviewed the case and blamed two deceased officers: Jackson police officer Buddy Kane and Mississippi Highway Patrolman Lloyd Jones. The Brown family filed a lawsuit and settled for $50,000 from the city of Jackson. There has been no marker on the JSU campus recognizing the events that took place.

The Southern Poverty Law Center memorialized Benjamin Brown as a civil rights martyr on a memorial designed by Maya Lin.

References

External links 
 Benjamin Brown Case File Closing

1945 births
1967 deaths
American civil rights activists
African Americans shot dead by law enforcement officers in the United States
Deaths by firearm in Mississippi